Çelikhan District is a district of Adıyaman Province of Turkey. Its seat is the town Çelikhan. Its area is 444 km2, and its population is 15,294 (2021).

Composition
There are 2 municipalities in Çelikhan District:
Çelikhan
Pınarbaşı

There are 20 villages in Çelikhan District:

 Aksu
 Altıntaş
 Askerhan
 Bozgedik
 Çampınar 
 Fatih
 Gölbağı
 İncirli 
 Kalecik
 Karaçayır
 Karagöl
 Korucak
 Köseuşağı
 Mutlu
 Recep
 Şerefhan
 Yağızatlı
 Yeşilova 
 Yeşiltepe
 Yeşilyayla

Demography 
Around 60% of the district is populated by Kurds from the Reşwan tribe including the main town of Çelikhan.

References

Districts of Adıyaman Province